San Gervasio Bresciano is a comune in the province of Brescia, in Lombardy. Points of interest are the "Bosco del Lusignolo" and the aquatic park "Le Vele". San Gervasio Bresciano is also known for its festival, the "Sagra di San Gervasio e della bassa", where one can find traditional dishes and products of that region.

References

Cities and towns in Lombardy